Catochrysops panormus, the silver forget-me-not, is a small butterfly found from India to the Philippines and south to Australia that belongs to the lycaenids or blues family. The species was first described by Cajetan Felder in 1860.

Subspecies
Listed alphabetically:
C. p. batchiana Tite, 1959 – Bachan, Halmahera, Obi
C. p. caerulea Tite, 1959 – New Hebrides
C. p. caledonica Felder – Loyalty Islands
C. p. exiguus (Distant, 1886) – India, Sumatra, Taiwan, southern Yunnan
C. p. panormus Sri Lanka, Indochina
C. p. papuana Tite, 1959 – Aru, West Papua, Papua, Bismarck Archipelago
C. p. platissa (Herrich-Schäffer, 1869) – Torres Strait Islands, northern Australia - New South Wales (Byron Bay)
C. p. pura Tite, 1959 – Solomon Islands (not Rennell Island)
C. p. rennellensis Howarth, 1962 – Rennell Island
C. p. timorensis Tite, 1959 – Timor, Wetar, Kissar

The subspecies of Catochrysops panormus found in India are:

 C. p. exiguus Distant, 1886 – Malay silver forget-me-not
 C. p. andamanica Tite, 1959 – Andaman silver forget-me-not

See also
List of butterflies of India
List of butterflies of India (Lycaenidae)

References

External links
 With images.

Butterflies of Asia
Butterflies of Singapore
Catochrysops